Micromyrtus greeniana is a plant species of the family Myrtaceae endemic to Western Australia.

The shrub is found in a small area of the Mid West region of Western Australia near Northampton where it grows in sandy soils.

References

greeniana
Flora of Western Australia
Plants described in 2010
Taxa named by Barbara Lynette Rye